Belper is a former constituency in the UK Parliament. It was created at the 1918 general election as a county division of Derbyshire, comprising the area in the centre of the county and surrounding Derby, and named after the market town of Belper although this was in the north of the constituency. In 1950 it was expanded to include the far south of the county. It was a marginal constituency for most of its existence.

The area had an ever-expanding population after 1945 as prosperous suburbs of Derby were built outside the city boundaries. Lord George-Brown, who represented the seat at the time, wrote in 1971 after his defeat in the 1970 general election that "The electorate had increased by over 10,000 since 1966, mainly from the growth of middle-class housing estates, so that most of the new electors could be expected to vote Tory. Since my majority in 1966 was 4,274, an influx of 10,000 new voters, mainly Tory, obviously imperilled the seat." A Boundary Commission report issued in 1969 had recommended changes which would have removed the extra voters, but the Labour government of the time had delayed implementation of the report.

Boundaries
When created in 1918, the constituency consisted of the Urban Districts of Alfreton, Belper and Heage, together with the Rural District of Belper and part of the Rural District of Repton (the civil parishes of Ash, Bearwardcote, Bretby, Burnaston, Dalbury Lees, Egginton, Etwall, Findern, Foremark, Ingleby, Mickleover, Newton Solney, Radbourne, Repton, Trusley, Twyford and Stenson, and Willington).

In 1950, boundary changes removed the Urban Districts of Alfreton and Heage to the Ilkeston constituency, together with the civil parish of Shipley from Belper Rural District. To compensate for this loss of electors, the changes transferred in the rest of the Repton Rural District from the West Derbyshire and South East Derbyshire constituencies. In addition from South East Derbyshire came the Urban District of Swadlincote.

In 1974 the boundaries were realigned with those for local government which had changed to transfer some electors to Derby; the constituency consisted of the urban districts of Belper and Swadlincote, and the rural districts of Repton and Belper except the civil parish of Shipley.

In 1983 the constituency was abolished; the largest part (40,000 voters around Swadlincote) formed the basis of South Derbyshire, 22,000 voters around Belper itself went to West Derbyshire, and 10,000 voters to Amber Valley.

Members of Parliament

Election results

Elections in the 1910s

Elections in the 1920s

Elections in the 1930s

Elections in the 1940s

Elections in the 1950s 
Boundary changes occurred at this point.

Elections in the 1960s

Elections in the 1970s 

Boundary changes occurred at this point.

References 

Parliamentary constituencies in Derbyshire (historic)
Constituencies of the Parliament of the United Kingdom established in 1918
Constituencies of the Parliament of the United Kingdom disestablished in 1983
Belper